The ancient Agora of Athens (also called the Classical Agora) is the best-known example of an ancient Greek agora, located to the northwest of the Acropolis  and bounded on the south by the hill of the Areopagus and on the west by the hill known as the Agoraios Kolonos, also called Market Hill. The Agora's initial use was for a commercial, assembly, or residential gathering place.

Buildings and structures of the classical agora

North side of the agora
 Stoa Poikile (Painted stoa), a building built in the 4th century B.C. used purely for socialising unlike many other buildings in the agora.
 Altar of the Twelve Gods
 Stoa Basileios (Royal stoa)
 Temple of Aphrodite Urania
The south end of what is believed to be a Basilica has been uncovered near Hadrian Street and is dated to the mid 100s CE

East side of the agora
 The Stoa of Attalos, a stoa lined with shops built in the 2nd century B.C. which has since been reconstructed for use as the Museum of The Ancient Agora.
 The Peristyle Court was a law court originally located under the northern end of the Stoa of Attalos.
A collection of buildings were added to the south-east corner: the East stoa, the Library of Pantainos, the Nymphaeum and a temple.
The Library of Pantainos was more than just a library, the west and north wings were series of rooms that were used for other purposes other than storing books. With the construction of the Library of Pantainos, the official entrance into the agora was now between the Library and the Stoa of Attalos.
 The Mint, a building which was used for the minting of bronze coinage in the 2nd and 3rd centuries B.C. but there is no evidence for it being used for the minting of Athenian silver coinage.
The Monopteros was located south of the Basilica and also dated to the mid 100s CE It had no walls, was a dome supported by columns and was about 8 meters in diameter.
The Bema was a speakers platform and was located near the Stoa of Attalos.

South side of the agora
The Middle stoa which was the most extensive monument built during the 2nd century B.C.
A small Roman temple was added in front of the Middle stoa.
 South-east Fountain House
 South Stoa I
 Aiakeion

West side of the agora
 Strategeion
 Agoraios Kolonos
 Tholos
 Boundary stone
 Monument of the Eponymous Heroes, a monument for the ten heroes of the tribes of Athens which was also used as a notice board for new legislation, public events and military conscription.
 Metroon (Old Bouleuterion)
 Bouleuterion
 Temple of Hephaestus (Hephaestion)
 Temple of Apollo Patroos
 Stoa of Zeus
The Temple of Zeus Phratrios and Athena Phratria dated to the 300s BCE and is located near the Temple of Apollo Patroos.
 A statue of the Roman emperor Hadrian was located near the metroon.

Other notable monuments

A number of other notable monuments were added to the agora. Some of these included:
An Altar of Zeus Agoraios was added just to the east of the Monument to the Eponymous Heroes.
The Temple of Ares, dedicated to Ares, the god of war, was added in the north half agora, just south of the Altar of the Twelve Gods.
The Odeon of Agrippa and accompanying gymnasium were added in the centre of the agora.
There is evidence of a Synagogue in the Agora of Athens in the 3rd century.

Gender roles in the Athenian Agora

Professions 
In the 4th and 5th centuries, there was significant evidence of women being innkeepers and merchants selling their products in the market of the Athenian agora.  Some of the products they sold include fruits, clothes, pottery, religious and luxury goods, perfume, incense, purple dye, wreaths, and ribbons.

Rituals 
The Athenian calendar glistened with religious festivals that were held in the Athenian agora. These festivals were significant for women as they provided a reason for them to leave their homes and socialize with people outside their family. Also, many of these religious festivals were performed by women; these duties included officiating  the worship of goddess Athena, the namesake of the city, Athens. Doing these rituals for goddesses was a prerequisite for the daughters of aristocratic families. Women of all ranks and classes could be seen making offerings at the small shrines that dotted the Agora in Athens. Also, women got to set up more substantial memorials to their piety within the agora. Religious festivals were a huge opportunity for the women of Athens to participate in their social culture.

Marble-workers in the Athenian Agora 

As of the early 5th century, the Ancient Agora of Athens was known as glorious and richly decorated, set with famous works of art, many of them sculpted from marble. The buildings of the Athenian Agora had marble decoration and housed dedications in the form of marble statues. Finds from the agora excavations identified that generations of marble-workers made the agora of Athens an important center for the production of marble sculptures. Marble-workers made sculptures, marble weights, sundials, furniture parts, an assortment of kitchen utensils. In the excavations of the Athenian agora revealed the remains of many marble-working establishments, and various unfinished statues, reliefs, and utilitarian objects.

Marble workshops in the Agora 
Excavations of the Athenian agora has proved that  marble-workers were very active, the earliest workshops being established in the early 5th century. The earliest areas used by marble workers was the residential and industrial district southwest of the agora. Another area where marble-workers set up shop was in the South Square, after the sack of Athens by the Roman general Sulla in 86 BC. As the South Square was in ruins, marble-workers were attracted to the remains of the marble temples. A workshop from the southern corner of the agora was also important, the Library of Pantainos rented out rooms to marble-workers.

Famous marble-workers in the Agora 
Literacy and evidence from excavations give a sense of statues and famous marble sculptors in the Athenian agora. These famous marble-workers of the Agora include, the 5th-century master Phidias and his associate Alkamenes, and the 4th-century sculptors Praxiteles, Bryaxis, and Euphranor.

Phidias 
Phidias was the most well known marble-worker to have worked in the agora. He was famous for his gold and ivory cult statue of Zeus at Olympia, and for his three lost sculptures of Athena.

Alcamenes 

A well-known associate of Phidias was Alcamenes, whose most important works in the agora were the bronze cult statues of Hephaestus and Athena in the Temple of Hephaestus.

Praxiteles and Bryaxis 
These famous sculptors are attested in the agora by the discovery of signed pieces of work that could no longer be preserved. A marble statue signed and possibly carved by  Bryaxis was found in the agora behind the Royal Stoa.

Euphranor 
The 4th century marble-worker known for his sculptures, made a colossal statue Apollo for the Temple of Apollo Patroos on the west side of the agora.

Excavations

The ancient Athenian agora has been excavated by the American School of Classical Studies at Athens (ASCSA) since 1931 under the direction of Thomas Leslie Shear, Sr. His wife Josephine Platner Shear who supervised the digging and led the study and conservation of numismatics from the site, as well as making the discovery of a new 2nd-century C.E. Athenian coin. The excavation was negotiated and directed by the ASCSA's chair of the agora excavation committee, Edward Capps, who the school would honor with a memorial overlooking the project. John McK Camp served as Director of the excavations since 1994, up until his retirement in 2022. John K. Papadopoulos is now in the position of Director following Camp’s retirement.

After the initial phase of excavation, in the 1950s the Hellenistic Stoa of Attalos was reconstructed on the east side of the agora, and today it serves as a museum and as storage and office space for the excavation team.

A virtual reconstruction of the Ancient Agora of Athens has been produced through a collaboration of the American School of Classical Studies at Athens and the Foundation of the Hellenic World, which had various output (3d video, VR real-time dom performance, Google Earth 3d models).

Flora
Evidence of planting was discovered during the excavations and on 4 January 1954, the first oak and laurel trees were planted around the Altar of Zeus by Queen Frederika and King Paul as part of the efforts to restore the site with plants that would have been found there in antiquity.

Museum of the Ancient Agora 
The museum is housed in the Stoa of Attalos, and its exhibits are connected with the Athenian democracy. The collection of the museum includes clay, bronze and glass objects, sculptures, coins and inscriptions from the 7th to the 5th century BC, as well as pottery of the Byzantine period and the Turkish occupation. The exhibition within the museum contains work of art which describes the private and public life in ancient Athens. In 2012, new sculpture exhibition was added to the museum which includes portraits from Athenian Agora excavation. The new exhibition revolves around portraits of idealized gods, officially honored people of the city,  wealthy Roman citizens of the 1st and 2nd century AD, 3rd-century citizens and finally on work of art from private art schools of late antiquity.

See also
 Ecclesia
 Church of the Holy Apostles

References

Further reading
 Camp, J. (2010). The Athenian Agora Site Guide. 5th ed. Princeton, NJ: American School of Classical Studies. 
 Dickenson, Christopher P. (2015). "Pausanias and the "Archaic Agora" at Athens." Hesperia: The Journal of the American School of Classical Studies at Athens 84.4: 723–770. 
 Dickenson, Christopher P. and Onno M. van Nijf ed. (2013).  Public Space in the Post-Classical City: Proceedings of a One Day Colloquium held at Fransum, 23rd July 2007. Caeculus, 7.   Leuven:  Peeters.
 Gawlinski, L. (2007). "The Athenian Calendar of Sacrifices: A New Fragment from the Athenian Agora." Hesperia 76:37–55.
 Harris, Edward Monroe (2014). "Wife, Household, and Marketplace." In Women Who Count in Greek History. Edited by Umberto Bultrighini, Elisabetta Dimauro. Lanciano: Carabba.
 Lang, M. (1994). Life, Death, and Litigation in the Athenian Agora. Agora Picturebook 23. Princeton, NJ: American School of Classical Studies at Athens.  
 Lang, M. (2004). The Athenian Citizen: Democracy in the Athenian Agora. Rev. ed. Agora Picturebook 4. Princeton, NJ: American School of Classical Studies at Athens.  (John McK. Camp's revision of 1987 1st edition)
 MacKinnon, Michael (2014). "Animals, Economics, and Culture in the Athenian Agora: Comparative Zooarchaeological Investigations." Hesperia: The Journal of the American School of Classical Studies at Athens 83.2: 189–255. 
 Thompson, D.B. (1971). The Athenian Agora: An Ancient Shopping Center. Agora Picturebook 12. Princeton, NJ: American School of Classical Studies at Athens. 
 Wycherley, R.E. (1973). The Athenian Agora. Vol. 3, Literary and Epigraphical Testimonia. Princeton, NJ: American School of Classical Studies.

External links

Hellenic Ministry of Culture: The Ancient Agora of Athens – official site with a schedule of its opening hours, tickets and contact information.
Agora Excavations  – American School of Classical Studies Agora excavation project.
Map of the Agora of Athens in Socrates and Plato's time
Agora of Athens in 421 BC
The Athenian Agora: A Short Guide in Color
The Athenian Agora. A Guide to the Excavation and Museum
Reconstruction of the Athenian Agora in Google Earth
Ministry of Culture: The Museum
www.athensinfoguide.com The Museum
Agora of Athens photos

 
Buildings and structures completed in the 6th century BC
Agora
American School of Classical Studies at Athens